Dope Machines is the fourth studio album by American indie-rock band The Airborne Toxic Event. The album was released on February 20, 2015, by Epic Records. It is the first studio album by the band to feature bassist Adrian Rodriguez who replaced their original bassist Noah Harmon since he was being fired from the group in August 2014, as well as  the last official studio album with their violinist Anna Bulbrook before she announced her departure from the group in September 2019.

Track listing

Charts

References

2015 albums
The Airborne Toxic Event albums
Epic Records albums